Liftoff, lift-off, or lift off may refer to:

Technology 
 Lift-off (microtechnology), a fabrication technique
 Flame lift-off, a separation of flame from burner device
 Takeoff, the first moment of flight of an aerospace vehicle
 Reduction of fuel input in a car as in lift-off oversteer

Art
 Lift Off (sculpture), in Washington, D.C., United States

Film and TV 
 Lift Off (Australian TV series), an Australian educational television show
 "Liftoff" (The West Wing), an episode of the United States television show The West Wing
 Lift Off with Ayshea, a music-based British television show, originally titled Lift Off

Music
"Lift Off", by Plas Johnson 
 "Lift Off" (song), by Jay-Z, Kanye West, and Beyoncé
"Lift Off", a song from Post Traumatic by Mike Shinoda featuring Chino Moreno & Machine Gun Kelly
 "Lift Off", an instrumental for guitar synthesizer composed by Les Fradkin
 "Lift Off!", a 2013 single by W&W